Annette Danto is a filmmaker, author, and Undergraduate Film Department Chairperson at Brooklyn College of the City University of New York.   She is a former Chairperson of the Feirstein Graduate School of Cinema (8/2021 - 1/2023). 

Danto holds a BA from McGill University (1980), an MS from Columbia University (1982), and an M.F.A. from New York University (1989). Danto has directed both fiction and documentary films.

Three times a Fulbright Scholar in filmmaking, and formerly president of the alumni association Friends of Fulbright to India, Danto is also a co-founder of nonprofit media organization AV Communications Trust, based in South India.

Having joined Brooklyn College in 1997, Danto is the founding director of two international, documentary-production programs there, one with India and one with Wales.

References

Year of birth missing (living people)
Living people
American film producers
American television producers
American women television producers
Columbia University alumni
Tisch School of the Arts alumni
Place of birth missing (living people)
McGill University alumni
Brooklyn College faculty